John St. Ledger Thornton (6 June 1911 – 18 August 1944) was a British hurdler. He competed in the men's 110 metres hurdles at the 1936 Summer Olympics. He was killed in action during World War II.

Personal life
Thornton served as a major in the Seaforth Highlanders during the Second World War. He served at El Alamein and in the Sicily Campaign, and was killed in action on 18 August 1944 during the Battle of Normandy. Thornton is buried at Banneville-la-Campagne War Cemetery.

References

External links

1911 births
1944 deaths
Military personnel from Nottinghamshire
Athletes (track and field) at the 1936 Summer Olympics
British male hurdlers
Olympic athletes of Great Britain
People from Nottinghamshire (before 1974)
Sportspeople from Nottinghamshire
British Army personnel killed in World War II
Seaforth Highlanders officers
Burials at Banneville-la-Campagne War Cemetery